The Hoëgne is a river in Belgium, a left tributary of the Vesdre. Its source is in the High Fens of eastern Belgium, near the Signal de Botrange. The Hoëgne flows through Theux, and ends in the Vesdre in Pepinster.

Rivers of the Ardennes (Belgium)
Rivers of Belgium
Rivers of Liège Province
Pepinster
Spa, Belgium
Theux